René Tirard (20 July 1899 – 12 August 1977) was a French sprint runner. He competed at the 1920 Summer Olympics in the 100 m, 200 m and 4×100 metre relay events and won a silver medal in the relay; he failed to reach the finals in his individual events.

References

1899 births
1977 deaths
French male sprinters
Olympic silver medalists for France
Athletes (track and field) at the 1920 Summer Olympics
Olympic athletes of France
Sportspeople from Le Havre
Medalists at the 1920 Summer Olympics
Olympic silver medalists in athletics (track and field)
19th-century French people
20th-century French people